The 1944 Fort Pierce football team represented the Fort Pierce Naval Amphibious Training Base in Tampa, Florida, during the 1944 college football season. The team compiled a 9–0 record and was ranked No. 18 in the final AP Poll.

Three players from the Fort Pierce team were named to the Associated Press All-Service southern football team: back Bill Daley; tackle Donald Cohenour; and center Bill Godwin.

Schedule

References

Fort Pierce
College football undefeated seasons
Fort Pierce football